Anshul Tripathi (born 2 June 1990) is an Indian cricketer. He made his Twenty20 debut for Madhya Pradesh in the 2017–18 Zonal T20 League on 12 January 2018. He made his List A debut for Madhya Pradesh in the 2017–18 Vijay Hazare Trophy on 5 February 2018.

References

External links
 

1990 births
Living people
Indian cricketers
Madhya Pradesh cricketers
People from Gwalior